The Contagious Diseases (Animals) Act 1893 (56 & 57 Vict. c. 43) was an Act of the Parliament of the United Kingdom passed by William Ewart Gladstone's Liberal government.

The Act transferred from local authorities to the Board of Agriculture the responsibility for wiping out swine fever. This was estimated to relieve local rates of up to £50,000.

Notes

United Kingdom Acts of Parliament 1893